The 1986 Dutch TT was the sixth round of the 1986 Grand Prix motorcycle racing season. It took place on the weekend of 26–28 June 1986 at the TT Circuit Assen located in Assen, Netherlands.

Classification

500 cc

References

Dutch TT
Dutch
Tourist Trophy